Atla praetermissa is a species of saxicolous (rock-dwelling), crustose lichen in the family Verrucariaceae. Found in Scandinavia, it was formally described as a new species in 2008 by Sanja Savić and Leif Tibell. The type specimen was collected in Andersjöåforsen (Funäsdalen, Härjedalen Municipality, Sweden). The lichen has a superficial, thin and sometimes mesh-like, crustose thallus that is grey to dark green, sometimes with a brownish tinge. Its ascospores are narrowly ellipsoidal and measure 44.7–49.2 by 19.0–22.4 μm. Atla praetermissa has an unidentified green alga as a photobiont.

References

Verrucariales
Lichen species
Lichens described in 2008
Lichens of Northern Europe
Taxa named by Leif Tibell